Sencelles is a municipality in central Majorca, one of the Balearic Islands, Spain. It is located in the centre of the island, 24km away from its capital, Palma.

References

Municipalities in Mallorca
Populated places in Mallorca